"Hay Que Poner el Alma" (English: "You’ve Gotta Put Your Soul Into It") is a song written by Omar Alfanno and performed by Puerto Rican singer Víctor Manuelle on his 1996 self-titled studio album  and was released as the lead single from the album. It became his first number song on the Tropical Airplay where it spent six weeks on this position and was the second best-performing tropical song of 1996. José A.Estévez, Jr. of AllMusic listed the song as one of the album's highlights. "Hay Que Poner el Alma" won "Tropical Song of the Year" at the 1997 SESAC Latin Music Awards which was presented to Alfanno.

Charts

Weekly charts

Year-end charts

See also
List of Billboard Tropical Airplay number ones of 1996

References

1996 songs
1996 singles
Víctor Manuelle songs
Songs written by Omar Alfanno
Song recordings produced by Sergio George
Sony Discos singles